KFDA may refer to:

 KFDA-TV
 Ministry of Food and Drug Safety (MFDS) of the Republic of Korea, formerly known as the Korea Food and Drug Administration (KFDA)